SBRR Mahajana First Grade College (Autonomous) Jayalakshmipuram, Mysore is a College with Potential for Excellence accredited A Grade by N.A.A.C. (National Assessment and Accreditation Council) during its 3rd Cycle and affiliated to University of Mysore. The college was founded in 1982 as a women's college offering B.A. & B.Com. courses. It was admitted to the grant-in-aid in 1987 and in 1988 became a co-educational institution. B.Sc. course was introduced in 1989, BBM course & Bio-technology, Biochemistry & Microbiology combination in B.Sc. were added in 1994 & 2004 respectively. BCA course was introduced in 2009. The College has applied for Autonomy and got the Autonomous status in 2019 from Mysore University.

Two boys were kidnapped on 8 June 2011 from the college premises and murdered by members of Karnataka Forum for Dignity, who sought ransom of 5 crore rupees.

Courses
B.A 
 History, Economics, Geography (HEG)
 History, Economics, Sociology (HES)
 History,  Geography, Kannada (HGK)
 Criminology, Psychology, Sociology (CPS)
B.Sc.- Bachelor of Science
 Physics, Mathematics, Computer Science (PMCs)
 Biochemistry, Microbiology, Bio-Technology (BMBt)
Other degrees
BBM-Bachelor of Business Management
B.Com - Bachelor of Commerce
B.C.A - Bachelor of Computer Application
Bachelor in Tourism and Hospitality (BTH)

Diploma, Certificate and Add-on Courses
 Hardware Networking and Maintenance - 6 months
 Drinking Water Quality Standard - 6 months
 Basics in Human Resource Development - 6 months
 Geo-Spatial Technologies - 6 months
 Eng. Language Grammar Usage & Phonetics - 2 sem
 Gandhian Studies - 1 year
 Short term Training in Hotel Management - 2 months
 Diploma in Hotel Management - 1 year
 Advance Diploma in Hospitality & Catering (Community College Courses) - 1 year
 Advance Diploma in Museology (Community College Course) - 1 year

References

Colleges affiliated to University of Mysore
 S.B.R.R Mahajana First Grade College
Educational institutions established in 1982